José María Pérez García (born 25 February 2001), commonly known as Farru, is a Spanish footballer who plays as a central defender for FC Cartagena B.

Club career
Born in Lorca, Region of Murcia, Farru was a youth product of Lorca CFB, the youth side of Lorca FC. He made his first team debut with the club on 26 August 2018, coming on as a late substitute in a 4–1 Tercera División home routing of EDMF Churra.

On 17 May 2019, Farru signed for UD Almería and returned to the youth setup. On 20 August 2020, he joined FC Cartagena and was assigned to the reserves in the fourth division.

On 27 October 2021, Farru renewed his contract with the Efesé until 2024. He made his debut with the main squad on 30 November, starting in a 2–0 away win over Racing Rioja CF in the season's Copa del Rey.

Farru made his professional debut on 30 October 2022, replacing Jairo Izquierdo late into a 0–0 home draw against Granada CF in the Segunda División.

References

External links

2001 births
Living people
People from Lorca, Spain
Spanish footballers
Footballers from the Region of Murcia
Association football defenders
Segunda División players
Segunda Federación players
Tercera División players
Tercera Federación players
Lorca FC players
FC Cartagena B players
FC Cartagena footballers